Jack White was a Canadian labour union activist. He was the first elected black representative of the Ironworkers, and one of the first Canadian Union of Public Employees (CUPE) national staff representatives from a minority background.

Born in Truro, Nova Scotia, White was one of the first black Canadians to run for election to the Legislative Assembly of Ontario for the Co-operative Commonwealth Federation in 1959. He stood as an Ontario New Democratic Party candidate in Dovercourt in the 1963 election. In the early 1960s, White was involved with a Toronto-based newspaper.

White was the son of Izie Dora White and Baptist minister William A. White, who served at Cornwallis Street Baptist Church in Halifax for nearly 20 years. His mother was born in Nova Scotia and his father migrated from the United States, where he was born to former slaves in Virginia.

From a family of 13 children, several of whom achieved national distinction, White was a brother of famed Canadian opera singer Portia White and politician Bill White, the first black Canadian to run for federal office. His niece Sheila White is a political strategist for the New Democratic Party, and his nephew Donald H. Oliver served several years as the first Black Canadian member of the Senate.

Legacy
  Jack White Community Service Award given by the Coalition of Black Trade Unionists (CBTU)

References

External links
CUPE Tribute to Jack White

Black Canadian politicians
Black Nova Scotians
Trade unionists from Ontario
Canadian people of African-American descent
Canadian people of American descent
Ontario New Democratic Party candidates in Ontario provincial elections
People from Colchester County
Politicians from Toronto
Year of birth missing (living people)
Living people